Binghamton University Events Center is the premier Division I Athletics and multipurpose facility at Binghamton University. The arena opened in 2004 and is adjacent to the Bearcat Sports Complex. It is home to the Binghamton Bearcats Division I Intercollegiate Athletic Program and can seat 5,142 patrons for home games, and over 8,000 for other large-scale events.  It has hosted the 2005, 2006, and 2008 America East Conference men's basketball tournaments; the 2007 American East women's tournament as well as the first round and quarterfinal of the 2018 WBI tournament. The Events Center was host to the 2009 America East Conference Championship game when the Bearcats defeated UMBC to make March Madness. The facility has also hosted commencements and concerts such as Bob Dylan, Green Day, Incubus, Ludacris, Foo Fighters, Drake and Harry Connick Jr.  The arena contains 53000 square feet (160 feet by 320 feet) of space.

History
The Events Center was built to create a Division I athletic and multipurpose facility in an addition to the West Gym.  The majority of sports and athletic administration are located at the Events Center with the exception of certain sports, such as Swimming & Diving, Volleyball and Wrestling. 
The Events Center is surrounded by ample parking facilities, athletic fields, the new Bearcat Sports Complex for soccer and lacrosse competitions and tennis courts. In December 2015, it was announced that the events center would host the NYSPHAA State Boys Basketball Championships from 2017–2019.

See also
 List of NCAA Division I basketball arenas

References

External links
Binghamton University Events Center website
Binghamton University Bearcats - Facilities

College basketball venues in the United States
College wrestling venues in the United States
Binghamton University buildings
Binghamton Bearcats men's basketball
Convention centers in New York (state)
Buildings and structures in Binghamton, New York
2004 establishments in New York (state)
Sports venues in New York (state)
Sports in Binghamton, New York
Sports venues in Broome County, New York
Sports venues completed in 2004
Basketball venues in New York (state)
Wrestling venues in New York (state)